Hradivka  (the former name —  Hoshany ), is a selo (village) in Lviv Raion, Lviv Oblast (province) of western Ukraine. It belongs to Horodok urban hromada, one of the hromadas of Ukraine.
Local government — Hradivska village council. The population of the village numbers approximately 1525 people.

Geography 

History 

The first record of the village called "Hoshany" dates back to 1426 year. Since 1961 — Hradivka.

Until 18 July 2020, Hradivka belonged to Horodok Raion. The raion was abolished in July 2020 as part of the administrative reform of Ukraine, which reduced the number of raions of Lviv Oblast to seven. The area of Horodok Raion was merged into Lviv Raion.

Churches and museums 
In the village there are two churches:
 Church of the Transfiguration (wood) 1878 (Previous church was built in 1735.) To the east of the Church is a three-tiered wooden belfry.
The church was built in 1878 (according to other sources 1854) was funded by the John Janka.
By 1934 was in the village priest Kazimir Hermak (1862 - 1934).
He was a husband of sisters Josaphat Kotsylovsky.
 Church of the Holy Eucharist (stone), which was consecrated in 2011.

In the village there is a private Regional museum of historical and sightseeing. The museum was established on the initiative villager I. Jacenko. The museum has more than 3 thousand exhibits.

Gallery

References

External links 
 village Hradivka
 Gradivka: Ukraine
 weather.in.ua

Villages in Lviv Raion